The Pattani–Betong Highway (Thang Luang Phaendin Sai Pattani-Betong) or National highway 410 is a major highway in Yala Province and Pattani Province of Thailand. The highway becomes Malaysia Federal Route 77 at the Thailand-Malaysia border.

List of Junctions and Towns

References

National highways in Thailand